Quiet Wedding is a 1938 comedy play in three acts by the British writer Esther McCracken. A young couple's plans for their wedding are undermined by the constant interruptions of their relatives. A sequel Quiet Weekend was written in 1941 and proved to be even more successful.

Film adaptations

In 1941 a film adaptation Quiet Wedding was directed by Anthony Asquith, starring Margaret Lockwood, Derek Farr and Marjorie Fielding. A further version appeared in 1958 as Happy Is the Bride, directed by Roy Boulting.

Radio adaptation
Quiet Wedding was presented on Theatre Guild on the Air 3 May 1953. The one-hour adaptation starred Diana Lynn, John Dall, and Jessie Royce Landis.

References

Plays by Esther McCracken
1938 plays
British plays adapted into films